= Dhiren Shah =

Indian cardiac surgeon

Dr. Dhiren Shah
- Born: 7 June 1974
- Occupation: Cardiothoracic & Vascular Surgeon
- Organization: CIMS Hospital

Dhiren Shah is a cardio-thoracic surgeon. He was the first doctor to have performed a heart transplant in Gujarat, India. He performed a bypass heart surgery on a 90 year old British man in Gujarat, making it the oldest patient to be performed in the state.
